Anisocentropus is a genus of caddisflies in the family Calamoceratidae. There are more than 60 described species in Anisocentropus.

Species
These 62 species belong to the genus Anisocentropus:

 Anisocentropus annulicornis (Hagen, 1858)
 Anisocentropus apis Malicky, 1998
 Anisocentropus bacchus Malicky & Chantaramongkol, 1994
 Anisocentropus banghaasi Ulmer, 1909
 Anisocentropus bellus Banks, 1931
 Anisocentropus bicoloratus (Martynov, 1914)
 Anisocentropus brevipennis (Ulmer, 1906)
 Anisocentropus brunneus Jacquemart, 1967
 Anisocentropus cameloides Malicky, 1995
 Anisocentropus corvinus Neboiss, 1980
 Anisocentropus cretosus McLachlan, 1875
 Anisocentropus croesus McLachlan, 1875
 Anisocentropus diana Malicky & Chantaramongkol, 1994
 Anisocentropus dilucidus McLachlan, 1863
 Anisocentropus eungellus Neboiss, 1980
 Anisocentropus fijianus Banks, 1936
 Anisocentropus fischeri Marlier, 1971
 Anisocentropus flavicaput (McLachlan, 1866)
 Anisocentropus flavomarginatus Ulmer, 1906
 Anisocentropus fulgidus Navás, 1933
 Anisocentropus fulvus Navás, 1934
 Anisocentropus furcatus (Banks, 1924)
 Anisocentropus golem Malicky, 1994
 Anisocentropus handschini Ulmer, 1951
 Anisocentropus hyboma Neboiss, 1986
 Anisocentropus illustris McLachlan, 1863
 Anisocentropus immunis McLachlan, 1863
 Anisocentropus insularis Martynov, 1930
 Anisocentropus io Kimmins, 1962
 Anisocentropus ittikulama Schmid, 1958
 Anisocentropus janus Malicky & Chantaramongkol, 1994
 Anisocentropus kawamurai Iwata, 1927
 Anisocentropus kempi Martynov, 1936
 Anisocentropus kirramus Neboiss, 1980
 Anisocentropus krampus Malicky, 1994
 Anisocentropus latifascia (Walker, 1852)
 Anisocentropus longulus Navás, 1933
 Anisocentropus maclachlani Ulmer, 1929
 Anisocentropus maculatus Ulmer, 1926
 Anisocentropus magnificus Ulmer, 1906
 Anisocentropus magnus (Banks, 1931)
 Anisocentropus minutus (Martynov, 1930)
 Anisocentropus muricatus Neboiss, 1980
 Anisocentropus nitidus Banks, 1937
 Anisocentropus orion Mey, 1997
 Anisocentropus pallidus Martynov, 1935
 Anisocentropus pan Malicky & Chantaramongkol, 1994
 Anisocentropus pandora Malicky & Chantaramongkol, 1994
 Anisocentropus pictilis Neboiss, 1986
 Anisocentropus piepersi McLachlan, 1875
 Anisocentropus pyraloides (Walker, 1852)
 Anisocentropus salsus (Betten, 1909)
 Anisocentropus samuh Olah & Johanson
 Anisocentropus semiflavus Banks, 1939
 Anisocentropus solomonis Banks, 1939
 Anisocentropus torulus Neboiss, 1980
 Anisocentropus triangulatus Ulmer, 1907
 Anisocentropus tristis Ulmer, 1929
 Anisocentropus ulmeri Malicky, 1998
 Anisocentropus usambarensis Ulmer, 1908
 Anisocentropus valgus Neboiss, 1980
 Anisocentropus voeltzkowi Ulmer, 1909

References

Further reading

External links

 

Trichoptera genera
Articles created by Qbugbot
Integripalpia